The Philosopher Kings are a Canadian band. The band was most commercially successful in the late 1990s and have been nominated for five Juno Awards, winning one in 1996 for "Best New Group". Most of the band members, current and former, have also had successful careers as songwriters and producers for several artists and performers. Between 1996 and 2016, The Philosopher Kings were among the top 150 selling Canadian artists in Canada and among the top 50 selling Canadian bands in Canada.

History
The Philosopher Kings formed in 1993. The name of the band is derived from Plato's Republic, in which he outlines the design of an idealistic government, ruled by philosopher-kings. The band released their debut album in Canada in 1994. The album was later released in the United States by Columbia. The group saw minor success in the United States with the single "Charms", which peaked at #36 on the Billboard Mainstream Top 40 chart in 1996. 

The band performed across Canada, and won the award for "Best New Group" at the 1996 Juno Awards. In 1997, the band released their second album, Famous, Rich and Beautiful. The album featured several singles which were hits in Canada, including "I Am the Man", "Hurts to Love You" and "Cry". The album was certified Platinum in Canada in 1998 and is the band's best-selling album. The band was nominated for "Best Group" at the 1999 Juno Awards. In 1999, drummer Craig Hunter was replaced by Denton Whited. The band was inactive from 2000 to 2003 as members pursued different projects. In 2004, all of the band members (minus Jason Levine) reunited and the band released the album Castles in 2006, with their lead single, "Castles in the Sand" reaching the top 10 on the Adult Contemporary and Hot Adult Contemporary charts in Canada. After going on hiatus again in the 2010s, the band reunited again in 2016. In 2018, the band released the album Return of the Kings.

Members

Current line-up
Gerald Eaton – vocalist
James Bryan McCollum – guitarist
Brian West – guitarist
Denton Whited – drummer
Marc Rogers – bassist
Matt Giffin – keyboardist

Past members
Craig Hunter – drummer on Philosopher Kings, Famous, Rich and Beautiful
Jason Levine – bassist on Philosopher Kings, Famous, Rich and Beautiful & One Night Stand
Jon Levine – keyboardist

Discography

Albums

Singles

Awards
1996 Juno Award – Best New Group

Nominations
1996 Juno nomination – Best R&B/Soul Recording for Philosopher Kings
1998 Juno nomination – Best R&B/Soul Recording for Famous, Rich and Beautiful
1999 Juno nominations – Best Pop Album for Famous, Rich and Beautiful; Best Single for Hurts To Love You; Best Group
2001 Juno nomination – Best R&B/Soul Recording for If I Ever Lose This Heaven

Side projects
Prozzäk and Lefthook Entertainment – James Bryan McCollum and Jason Levine
Jarvis Church – Gerald Eaton
Track and Field – Gerald Eaton and Brian West
solo albums – Jon Levine; James Bryan

References

External links
Philosopher Kings official website
Return of the Kings Metro, November 15, 2005
Marc Rogers website
Jon Levine Band website
James Bryan website
James Bryan's Official Website

Canadian contemporary R&B musical groups
Juno Award for Breakthrough Group of the Year winners
Canadian soul music groups
Canadian funk musical groups
Musical groups from Toronto
Musical groups established in 1993
1993 establishments in Ontario